David (Davie) McDougall (14 July 1858 – 7 November 1943) was a United Party and an Independent Member of Parliament for Mataura, in the South Island of New Zealand.

Biography

Early life
Born in Glasgow, Scotland, McDougall came to New Zealand with his wife in 1884, arriving at Port Chalmers on 11 May on the Aorangi.

Political career

McDougall served on the Gore Borough Council and was Mayor of Gore in 1913, 1915–1919, 1921–1923 and 1927–1928.

In the 1928 and s elections, he was elected as a United Party MP. In 1933, he had voted with Labour members in Parliament on a no-confidence motion and was then excluded from the Coalition Government caucus. In the  McDougall stood as an Independent, and was not opposed by Labour. He was successful, and generally voted with Labour.

Davie McDougall was a conspicuous figure in Parliament with his tartan waistcoat and colourful language and behaviour. John A. Lee wrote that McDougall developed a habit of "peppering his talk with humorous asides", which became part of his style as a politician.

Davie McDougall "spoke out for the social and economic progress for the people he represented so well and carved for himself a unique place in New Zealand's political history". He retired to Dunedin, where he died in 1943, survived by 12 of his 13 children.

Notes

References

1858 births
1943 deaths
Independent MPs of New Zealand
United Party (New Zealand) MPs
Politicians from Glasgow
Scottish emigrants to New Zealand
Mayors of Gore
Members of the New Zealand House of Representatives
New Zealand MPs for South Island electorates
Unsuccessful candidates in the 1938 New Zealand general election
Unsuccessful candidates in the 1919 New Zealand general election
Unsuccessful candidates in the 1922 New Zealand general election